Ilene Strizver is a noted typographic educator, author, designer and founder of The Type Studio in Westport, Connecticut. Her book, Type Rules! The designer’s guide to professional typography, is now in its 4th edition.

Life and career
Strizver was the Director of Typeface Development for International Typeface Corporation (ITC), where she developed more than 300 text and display typefaces with such respected and world-renowned type designers as Sumner Stone, Erik Spiekermann, Jill Bell, Jim Parkinson, Tim Donaldson, and the late Phill Grimshaw. Prior to ITC, she was Creative & Production Director of Upper & lowercase (U&lc), the award-winning international journal for typography and typographic design. She worked with such legendary type icons as Ed Benguiat, Aaron Burns and Herb Lubalin.

Strizver has written for HOW, Dynamic Graphics, and STEP Inside Design, Letterspace and U&lc Online. She is the author of fy(t)I For Your Typographic Information, which is published at www.fonts.com and www.itcfonts. com. She also writes TypeTalk for creativepro.com. Strizver has conducted her Gourmet Typography workshops nationally and internationally. Her clients include International Typeface Corporation (ITC), Monotype Imaging Corporation, Adobe, Linotype, Galápagos Design Group, Whole Foods, Harlequin Books, Somerset Entertainment, Integrated Marketing, Parents Magazine, MeadWestvaco, Nationwide Insurance, Life is good, Inc., Alliance Atlantis, Johnson & Johnson, Nassau Guardian, and b-there.com.

Strizver is a member of the NY Type Directors Club, where she served two terms on the board of directors. She was chairperson of the TDC2 Type Design Competition. She also served two terms on the board of directors of the Society of Typographic Aficionados (SOTA), and chaired the SOTA Type and Design Education Forum from 2006 to 2009. She is a faculty member at the School of Visual Arts in New York City.

Education
After studying the French horn at SUNY Binghamton, Strizver received a BFA in art and painting from the University of New Mexico. She continued studying graphic arts and calligraphy at the School of Visual Arts, where she was mentored by Benguiat.

External links
http://www.thetypestudio.com/
https://web.archive.org/web/20100827003449/http://www.creativepro.com/articles/author/127543
http://www.fonts.com/AboutFonts/Articles/fyti/index.htm

1953 births
Living people
American typographers and type designers